The Battle of Providien was the second in a series of naval battles fought between a British fleet, under Vice-Admiral Sir Edward Hughes, and a French fleet, under the Bailli de Suffren, off the coast of India during the Anglo-French War. The battle was fought on 12 April 1782 off the east coast of Ceylon, near a rocky islet called Providien, south of Trincomalee.

Background

In 1778, France had entered the American Revolutionary War; and in 1780 Britain declared war on the Dutch Republic after the Dutch refused to stop trading military supplies with France and America. The British had rapidly gained control over most French and Dutch outposts in India when news of these events reached India, spawning the Second Anglo-Mysore War in the process.

In March 1781, French Admiral Bailli de Suffren was dispatched on a mission to provide military assistance to French colonies in India, leading a fleet of five ships, seven transports, and a corvette to escort the transports from Brest. After a happenstance battle with the British fleet at Porto Praya in the Cape Verde Islands in April, the French fleet stopped at the Dutch-controlled Cape of Good Hope in October. Troops were left to assist the Dutch in defence of that colony while the fleet was reinforced by additional ships with command transferred to the elderly Admiral Thomas d'Estienne d'Orves. The French fleet sailed on to Île de France (now Mauritius), arriving at Port Louis in December. They then sailed for India with transports that carried nearly 3,000 men under the command of the Comte du Chemin. D'Orves died in February 1782, shortly before the fleet arrived off the Indian coast, and Suffren resumed command.

Suffren first sailed for Madras, hoping to surprise the British stronghold. When he found the fleet of Sir Edward Hughes anchored there on 15 February 1782, he turned south with the intent of landing troops at Porto Novo, hoping to march up the coast and recapture French and Dutch holdings on the way. Hughes raised anchor and sailed after Suffren. In the Battle of Sadras, both fleets suffered damage without loss of ships, but the French were able to safely land troops at Porto Novo to assist the Mysoreans. Suffren made repairs to his fleet at Pondicherry after that battle; on 23 February, he sailed out to find Hughes, who had gone to Trincomalee for repairs.

On 8 April, Hughes's fleet was spotted heading for Trincomalee. Suffren gave chase, but was unable to close for three days. Hughes had to change course on 12 April to continue toward Trincomalee, which gave Suffren the advantage of the wind.

Battle
The battle lines engaged at about 12:30 pm.  Initially, some of Suffren's captains hesitated, not immediately joining in the line (as had also happened at Sadras), but eventually ten of his twelve ships were engaged against the eleven British ships.  was the first ship to quit the British line after being dismasted, and  also suffered significant damage in the early rounds.  Hughes was able to regain advantage by ordering his fleet to wear ship, and the battle began to turn against the French.  Around 6:00 pm, a storm arose; the combatants, close to a lee shore, broke off the battle to attend to the risks the storm presented. Darkness from the storm and then nightfall precluded further battle that day.

Aftermath
The fleets had anchored near enough to each other that Suffren again positioned for battle. Hughes, however, had a convoy to protect, and sailed for Trincomalee. Suffren sailed south and anchored at Batticaloa, which was still under Dutch control, where he spent six weeks for repairs and resupply. While there, he received orders to sail to Île de France to escort another troop convoy. Suffren chose to disregard this order, as the risk posed by Hughes to French operations required his full strength, and he could not trust his captains. The captains of Vengeur and Artésien, the two ships that stayed out of the action, were reported for their failure to obey orders, and his second-in-command was intriguing with some of the other captains against him.

Order of battle

Notes, citations, and references 

Notes

Citations

References

 

Providien
Providien
Providien
Conflicts in 1782
1782 in France